Greatest Hits is a compilation album by American rock band the Doors, released in 1980. The album, along with the film Apocalypse Now, released the previous year, created for the band an entirely new audience of the generation that did not grow up with the Doors. The album went on to become one of the highest-selling compilations of all time, with combined CD and vinyl sales of 5,000,000 in the United States alone.

The album was re-released in October 1996 as an enhanced CD with a different track listing and cover art. The songs "The Ghost Song", "The End" and "Love Her Madly" were added, whereas "Not to Touch the Earth" was omitted.

Critical reception

Critic Andy Kellman of AllMusic, reviewing the 1996 reissue, rated Greatest Hits with three-and-a-half out of five stars, and praised that it compiled "some of the band's most enduring songs", such as "Light My Fire," "Break on Through", "Touch Me", "Hello, I Love You" and "Riders on the Storm". His only complaints were on "Not to Touch the Earth" and "The Ghost Song" as "poor choices" and that it could "have been replaced with any number of more significant songs in the band's catalog".

Track listing
All songs written by all members of the Doors (Jim Morrison, Ray Manzarek, Robby Krieger, John Densmore), except "Light My Fire" which some sources identify Krieger and Morrison to be the lone songwriters. Details are taken from the 1980 Elektra Records release and may differ from other sources.

1996 additional CD tracks
 "Love Her Madly" (Krieger) – 3:17
 "The Ghost Song" (Morrison) – 4:13
 "The End" – 6:28 (edited version for George S. Clinton from Apocalypse Now (1979))
 "Wintertime Love" (Japanese 1995 CD version only)

Personnel
Per album notes as shown at the Back cover:

The Doors
 Jim Morrison – vocals
 Robby Krieger – guitar
 John Densmore – drums
 Ray Manzarek – keyboards

Additional musicians
 Lonnie Mack - bass guitar
 Doug Lubahn – bass guitar
 Jerry Scheff – bass guitar
 Harvey Brooks – bass guitar
 John Sebastian – harmonica
 Curtis Amy – saxophone
 Marc Benno – rhythm guitar

Technical
 Paul A. Rothchild – production, re-mastering
 Bruce Botnick – production (as well as the Doors)
 William Gazecki – re-mastering engineer
 Joel Brodsky – photography
 Ron Coro – original art direction
 Ray and Dorothy Manzarek, Ron Coro, Denise Minobe – album design

Charts

Weekly charts

Year-end charts

Certifications

References

1980 greatest hits albums
Albums produced by Paul A. Rothchild
The Doors compilation albums
Elektra Records compilation albums
Albums with cover art by Joel Brodsky